For the 1995 Rugby World Cup qualifiers, the European Federation was allocated three places in the final tournament. This was in addition to the four places granted to England, France, Ireland and Scotland based on their results from 1991.

Twenty two teams played in the European qualifiers that were held over three stages in 1993 and 1994.

Preliminary round

West Group 
Switzerland qualify for Round 1.

Luxembourg withdrew from the group.

Match Schedule

Central Group 
Israel qualify for Round 1.

Yugoslavia was banned from qualification process due to the political situation in the country at the time.

Match Schedule

Round 1
Spain and Portugal qualify for Round 2.

West Group 

Match Schedule

Central Group 
Netherlands and Czech Republic qualify for Round 2.

Match Schedule

East Group A 
Russia qualify for Round 2.

Match Schedule

East Group B 
Germany  qualify for Round 2.

Match Schedule

Round 2
Wales qualify for Round 3.

West Group 

Match Schedule

Central Group 
Italy qualify for Round 3.

Match Schedule

East Group 
Romania qualify for Round 3.

Match Schedule

Round 3
Wales, Italy and Romania qualify for RWC 1995 as Europe 1, Europe 2 and Europe 3, respectively.

Match Schedule

References

1995
European
1992–93 in European rugby union
1993–94 in European rugby union
1994–95 in European rugby union